The 2013 NCAA Division I Field Hockey Championship was the 33rd women's collegiate field hockey tournament organized by the National Collegiate Athletic Association, to determine the top college field hockey team from Division I in the United States. The Connecticut Huskies defeated the Duke Blue Devils in the finals to win their third national championship. The championship was played on November 24, 2013 at the L.R. Hill Sports Complex on the home field of the host Old Dominion Lady Monarchs in Norfolk, Virginia.

National seeds

Bracket

References 

2013
Field Hockey
2013 in women's field hockey
2013 in sports in Virginia